Paul Edward Covington (July 26, 1934 – November 22, 2020) was an American college basketball coach. He was the head coach of the Jackson State Tigers from 1967 to 1986.

Covington played three sports at Jackson State – basketball, tennis, and baseball. After his college career was over, he became head basketball coach at Higgins High School in Clarksdale, Mississippi. He then moved to Coahoma Community College for four seasons before returning to his alma mater as an assistant coach in 1964. He became the school’s head coach in 1967.

He served as the Tigers' coach for 19 seasons, leading the program from the National Association of Intercollegiate Athletics (NAIA) to NCAA Division I during that time. He left as the school’s all-time winningest coach with a record of 338–195.

After his retirement as basketball coach, Covington became an assistant athletic director for the University. He served as the school’s athletic director from 1995 to 1999.

Covington died on November 22, 2020, at age 86 of complications from pneumonia.

References

1934 births
2020 deaths
American men's basketball coaches
American men's basketball players
Basketball coaches from Kentucky
Basketball players from Kentucky
College men's basketball head coaches in the United States
High school basketball coaches in Mississippi
Jackson State Tigers and Lady Tigers athletic directors
Jackson State Tigers baseball players
Jackson State Tigers basketball coaches
Jackson State Tigers basketball players
Junior college men's basketball coaches in the United States
People from Richmond, Kentucky
University of Kentucky alumni